Barber House, Barber Farm, or Barber Barn may refer to:

in the United States

Giles Barber House, Windsor, Connecticut, listed on the National Register of Historic Places (NRHP) in Windsor, Connecticut
Barber-Pittman House, Valdosta, Georgia, listed on the NRHP in Georgia
Obediah Barber Homestead, Waycross, Georgia, listed on the NRHP in Georgia
Bryant H. and Lucie Barber House, Polo, Illinois, listed on the NRHP in Illinois
Henry D. Barber House, Polo, Illinois, listed on the NRHP in Illinois
Barber-Barbour House, Harrods Creek, Kentucky, listed on the NRHP in Kentucky
Kendrick-Tucker-Barber House, Mooresville, Kentucky, listed on the NRHP in Kentucky
John R. Barber House, Springfield, Kentucky, listed on the NRHP in Kentucky
Morse-Barber House, Sherborn, Massachusetts, listed on the NRHP in Massachusetts
Belknap House, Carson City, Nevada, also known as the Barber-Belknap House, NRHP-listed
Barber-Mulligan Farm, Avon, New York, listed on the NRHP in New York
Barber Farm (Cleveland, North Carolina), listed on the NRHP in North Carolina
O. C. Barber Barn No. 1, Barberton, Ohio, NRHP-listed
O. C. Barber Colt Barn, Barberton, Ohio, NRHP-listed
O. C. Barber Machine Barn, Barberton, Ohio, NRHP-listed
O. C. Barber Piggery, Barberton, Ohio, NRHP-listed
Barber-Whitticar House, Canton, Ohio, listed on the NRHP in Ohio
 Barber House (Hopkins, South Carolina), listed in the NRHP in South Carolina
Charles A. Barber Farmstead, Lily, South Dakota, listed on the NRHP in South Dakota
 Barber House (San Marcos, Texas), listed on the NRHP in Texas
Barnard-Garn-Barber House, Centerville, Utah, listed on the NRHP in Utah
James Barber House, Eau Claire, Wisconsin, listed on the NRHP in Wisconsin